Amir Vahedi (February 25, 1961 – January 8, 2010) was an Iranian professional poker player born in Tehran, Iran. who won a World Series of Poker (WSOP) bracelet at the 2003 World Series of Poker in the $1,500 No Limit Hold'em event.

World Series of Poker 
Vahedi was named No Limit Texas hold 'em player of the year in 2001 and was runner-up to Men Nguyen for Card Player Magazine's 2003 Player of the Year.  In 2003 he made the final table of the Main Event of the World Series of Poker and finished sixth, earning $250,000. Earlier in the series, he won his first WSOP bracelet in the $1,500 No Limit Hold'em event for $270,000.

During the 2003 World Series of Poker, in reference to the natural tendency of players to tighten up on the bubble (when only a few eliminations are left to the money), Vahedi stated: "In order to live, you must be willing to die."

Vahedi was also the season three champion of the Ultimate Poker Challenge.

During his lifetime, Vahedi won over $3,250,000 in live tournament play. His nine cashes at the WSOP account for $671,216 of those winnings.

World Series of Poker bracelet

Personal life
Vahedi served in the Iranian army during the Iran–Iraq War before becoming a war refugee and immigrating to the US, settling in Sherman Oaks, California. He was one of Ben Affleck's early poker tutors.

Vahedi died at the age of 48 due to possible complications of diabetes on January 8, 2010.

Notes

1961 births
2010 deaths
Iranian poker players
World Series of Poker bracelet winners
Deaths from diabetes
People from Tehran
Iranian emigrants to the United States
Islamic Republic of Iran Army soldiers of the Iran–Iraq War